John Craig Eaton II (born May 30, 1937, in Toronto, Ontario) is a Canadian philanthropist and former businessman who is a member of the prominent Eaton family.

Family and career
He is the great-grandson of Timothy Eaton, founder of the former Eaton's department store. He is married to his third wife, Sally Horsfall Eaton, a philanthropist and former registered nurse.

He is the grandson of Sir John Craig Eaton, and the son of John David Eaton and Signy Hildur Stefansson Eaton. He is the brother of George Ross Eaton, Thor Edgar Eaton, and Fredrik Stefan Eaton.

In his youth, Eaton attended Upper Canada College. He started working in the family business at Eaton's in 1954, becoming a director in 1967 and being appointed chairman of the board in 1969. The company went bankrupt in 1999 and was purchased by Sears Canada, which also subsequently went bankrupt.

He is a supporter of Ducks Unlimited Canada and served as its president from 1990 to 1991. Eaton served as chancellor of Ryerson University from 1999 to 2006. In 2000, he was appointed chair of the board of governors of Ontario Parks.

Honours and awards
Doctor of Commerce (D.Com.), honoris causa, Ryerson University
Knight of Justice (KStJ) of the Most Venerable Order of the Hospital of St. John of Jerusalem
Member of the Order of Ontario (1991)

References

External links
Ryerson University biography

John Craig Eaton
Canadian businesspeople in retailing
Members of the Order of Ontario
Businesspeople from Toronto
Chancellors of Toronto Metropolitan University
Living people
1937 births